University of Westminster Press is the open access academic press of the University of Westminster, England. It publishes academic books and peer-reviewed journals and runs on the Ubiquity Press platform.

References

External links
University of Westminster Press official website

University presses of the United Kingdom